Cabacés is a municipality in the comarca of Priorat in the province of Tarragona, Catalonia, Spain. It is also known as Cabassers, which was its official name until 1989.

See also
Municipal elections in Cabacés

References

External links
 Municipal website
 Government data pages 

Municipalities in Priorat